Clifford A. Wolff is a litigation and employment law attorney based in Fort Lauderdale, Florida, United States. Mr. Wolff is licensed to practice law in Florida, New York and Washington, D.C.

Personal background
Clifford A. Wolff was born in New York City on April 7, 1970, the son of Judy Wolff and Malcolm Wolff. Malcolm Wolff was a vice-president for CBS in New York City from 1980 to 1987. After working in the corporate environment, Malcolm Wolff pursued the artistic path, attending the Florence Academy of Art in Italy. Malcolm Wolff currently has several sculptures on permanent exhibition in Asheville, North Carolina, St. Augustine, Florida, and Las Vegas, Nevada as well as The Vatican, Italy.

Clifford Alan Wolff was the namesake of his great-aunt, Claire Alice Wolff, who hosted a talk radio show in New York City from 1942 to 1945. Her radio show was recorded and broadcast from the 86th floor of the Empire State Building in the CBS Studios. The radio program was discontinued when a B-25 Mitchell crashed into the north side of the 79th floor of the building. In 1946, Claire Wolff conceived the idea of the first interfaith postage stamp. It was known as "The Four Chaplains" and commemorated the sacrifice of four clergymen in the United States Army who gave up their life preservers to other service men aboard the troop transport . The four clergy died so that other servicemen could live. The United States Post Office approved the stamp in 1948 for general sale and circulation. It was the first postage stamp ever issued by the Post Office commemorating a Jew, Rabbi Alexander Goode. From this recognition, there now exists a stained glass window in the chapel of the Pentagon.

Educational background
Clifford Wolff attended Nova Elementary School and Nova Middle School in Davie, Florida.  He went on to attend Coral Springs High School in Coral Springs, Florida. While a high school student, Wolff was a member of the National Honor Society, Debate Team and Math Team. United States Senator George S. LeMieux was a fellow debate team member at Coral Springs High School.  Mr. Wolff graduated in the top five percent of his high school class in 1988. He then attended the University of Florida, in Gainesville, Florida, where he majored in English literature and mathematics at the College of Liberal Arts and Sciences.  He was a member of Theta Chi Fraternity, was routinely appointed to the Dean's List for academic excellence, and was active in campus politics. He graduated in 1992 as a University of Florida Presidential Scholar. This award was presented to students graduating with excellent academic credentials and esteemed community service.

Wolff then attended the University of Florida Levin College of Law. He was immediately recognized for his advocacy skills. He was the only first-year law student in his class chosen for both the University of Florida Trial Team and the Justice Campbell Thornal Moot Court Board. He earned the award of Champion Advocate at the 1995 Mock Trial Competition sponsored by the Association of Trial Lawyers of America in Salt Lake City, Utah. Wolff also competed in appellate argument competitions in Chicago, New York City, and St. Louis. He graduated from law school in 1995. He was one of just two law students who received upon graduation election into the international advocacy honorary known as The Order of Barristers, signifying excellence in litigation skills.

Work history
Mr. Wolff was immediately admitted to the Florida Bar and went to work for Josephs, Jack and Gaebe, a litigation boutique in Miami. He represented U-Haul International and its affiliates and was also involved in multimillion-dollar commercial litigation throughout Florida. Mr. Wolff then worked for the law firm of Gunster Yoakley.  Mr. Wolff was subsequently courted by the law firm of Gordon, Hargrove and James in Fort Lauderdale, later known as Sedgwick Law Firm. He accepted the position and represented AT&T, BellSouth, Yahoo!, U-Haul, Carrier Corporation, Schindler Group, Otis Elevator Corporation, the UTC Companies and W.R. Grace and Company. Mr. Wolff filed a lawsuit on behalf of W.R. Grace and Company against American International Group (AIG) seeking reimbursement of hundreds of millions of dollars paid by W.R. Grace to resolve mass tort asbestos claims denied under an alleged fraud exclusion of various insurance policies. AIG eventually capitulated  following depositions taken by Mr. Wolff of various executive vice-presidents and days before Mr. Wolff was scheduled to take the court-ordered deposition of AIG chairman Hank Goldberg. After this success, Mr. Wolff was the youngest attorney ever made partner at Sedgwick Law Firm.  Shortly after being elected a law partner, and at the request of several clients, Wolff started his own law firm, The Wolff Law Firm, in 2005.

In addition to working as a commercial litigator, Wolff is currently general counsel of Lynch Holdings, L.P., a holding company for various assets including real estate, securities and intellectual property. Mr. Wolff is actively involved in the valuation, purchase, defense and licensing of such assets. He also acts as personal counsel for high net-worth individuals, directors and executive officers of companies such as Barnes & Noble, Peloton, Sam's Club, Wal-Mart, eBay, Gilt Groupe, AirTable.com, Hiller Industries, Nike, Two Sigma and CVS.  Mr. Wolff also represented San Felasco Nurseries, one of the six Florida license holders for the growth and sale of medical marijuana.  Mr. Wolff assisted San Felasco Nurseries during its application process, its appeal process, and ultimately its successful achievement of a license to grow and sell medical marijuana.  Mr. Wolff went on to represent Acreage Holdings, one of the largest cannabis-related investment firms in the world.  Mr. Wolff also represented the lead investor in a $21 million Series B capital raise for Jane Technologies, the largest online cannabis inventory reservation system in the United States. In 2020, Mr. Wolff represented the individual who became Chief Executive Officer of eBay during the global COVID-19 pandemic. This was the first, completely virtual hire of a Chief Executive Officer of a public company in the United States.

Published works
In addition to his work with some preeminent clients, Mr. Wolff was involved in a matter for Boca Burger, a division of Kraft Foods. Mr. Wolff, along with other members of his law firm, were successful at the trial court level. However, the Florida Fourth District Court of Appeal disagreed with Mr. Wolff, and sanctioned his law firm for defending the matter. The issue was appealed and reached the Florida Supreme Court.  The Florida Supreme Court agreed with Mr. Wolff and his law firm.  The Florida Supreme Court held that the appellate court incorrectly adjudicated the matter, reversed the decision of the appellate court, reversed sanctions, determined that the issue of preemption pursuant to the Florida Food Safety Act was a valid defense presented at the initial stages of litigation.  These decision has been cited over forty-five (45) times by Florida courts since 2005.

Mr. Wolff has been the managing partner of The Wolff Law Firm located in Fort Lauderdale, Florida.  The Wolff Law Firm has been in continuous existence since 2005.  Among other matters, Mr. Wolff successfully defended claims of usury.  Mr. Wolff has countless awards and innumerable public service activities.  Mr. Wolff is admitted to practice law in Florida, New York and Washington, D.C.  Mr. Wolff currently holds an AV-Rated Preeminent ranking of 5.0 out of 5.0 by the Martindale-Hubbell Peer Review System.  Less than five percent of all attorneys are AV-rated by Martindale-Hubbell.  In 2010, Mr. Wolff was also selected as a "Florida Super Lawyer" by Super Lawyers Magazine.  Less than five percent of lawyers are selected by the magazine after a nomination and peer-review process.  Mr. Wolff effectively represents Fortune 100 companies, Florida 500 Companies, and some of the wealthiest businesspersons in South Florida.  Clifford Wolff has been practicing law for over 25 years, and The Wolff Law Firm has been in business for over 15 consecutive years.

Mr. Wolff is listed in Who's Who of American Law, Who's Who of Emerging Leaders, has been seen on television on CNN with Wolf Blitzer on The Situation Room and in publications such as The Miami Herald, the Fort Lauderdale Sun-Sentinel, the New York Daily News, the South Florida Business Journal and Daily Business Review.  Mr. Wolff currently represents construction companies, air conditioning companies, roofing companies, health care companies, marijuana-related businesses, foreign real estate investors and vitamin companies around the world.

Among the most notable clients, The Wolff Law Firm represented Alcor Life Extension Foundation, the largest cryonics company in the world. Mr. Wolff advocated for—and successfully obtained—on behalf of an Alcor member the first known "virtual autopsy" in Florida.  The virtual autopsy was performed using a portable CT Scan in Hillsborough County, Florida to avoid intrusion into the brain of an Alcor member after death.  The matter received a great deal of media attention.  In February 2010, Mr. Wolff successfully obtained an order from a court in Palm Beach County, Florida for the second virtual autopsy known in Florida for yet another Alcor member.  Mr. Wolff was also interviewed extensively on ABC News, Good Morning Phoenix on KTVK, and The Denver Post in connection with litigation over an Alcor member from Colorado Springs, Colorado who left her remains to Alcor pursuant to the Colorado Disposition of Remains Act and the Uniform Anatomical Gift Act.  The family of the Alcor member sought revocation of the anatomical gift based on an alleged change of a financial beneficiary in connection with a life insurance annuity.  Alcor prevailed in court and the written desire of the Alcor member to be cryopreserved was fulfilled.

Mr. Wolff also successfully represented San Felasco Nurseries in its application process for one of six licenses in Florida to grow and sell medical marijuana.  Mr. Wolff also assisted in the challenge process, and the ultimate award process to enable San Felasco Nurseries to commence the growth, cultivation, packaging and sale of medical marijuana in throughout Florida.  Mr. Wolff was often quoted in new outlets during the application and award process, including his representation of marijuana trade associations.  He continues to assist early-stage cannabis companies with licensure and business development in Florida.

References

1970 births
Living people
Lawyers from New York City
University of Florida alumni
Fredric G. Levin College of Law alumni